Willis 'Bill' John Tewksbury (1905–1999), was a United States international lawn bowler.

Bowls career
He won a silver medal in the pairs with Jim Candelet at the 1972 World Outdoor Bowls Championship in Worthing. He also won a bronze medal in the team event (Leonard Trophy).

Awards
He was inducted into the USA Hall of Fame and was a seven times National Champion.

References

1905 births
1999 deaths
American male bowls players